Bossiaea concolor is a species of flowering plant in the family Fabaceae and is endemic to eastern Australia. It is an erect shrub with elliptic to oblong or egg-shaped leaves with the lower end towards the base, and yellow and red flowers.

Description
The leaves are usually concave or folded lengthwise.

Taxonomy
This species was first formally described in 1908 by Joseph Maiden and Ernst Betche who gave it the name Bossiaea rhombifolia subsp. concolor in the Proceedings of the Linnean Society of New South Wales. In 2012 Ian R. Thompson raised the variety to species status as Bossiaea concolor in the journal Muelleria. The specific epithet (concolor) means "uniformly coloured".

Distribution and habitat
Bossiaea concolor grows in woodland and forest, mostly to the west of the Great Dividing Range, from near Shoalwater Bay in Queensland to near Mudgee in New South Wales.

References 

concolor
Flora of Queensland
Flora of New South Wales
Plants described in 1908
Taxa named by Joseph Maiden
Taxa named by Ernst Betche